Headley is a village and civil parish in the North Downs in Surrey, England. The nearest settlements are, to the west, Mickleham and Leatherhead; to the north, Ashtead and Langley Vale; to the east, Walton-on-the-Hill; and to the south, Box Hill. It is just outside the M25 motorway encircling London.

History
The Romans had an influence nearby, with the Roman Road to Noviomagus Reginorum, called by the Saxons Stane Street, some 2 km from the village, and a considerable Roman presence in the neighbouring village of Walton-on-the-Hill with its scheduled ancient monument villa and other finds.

Headley's land lay in the Saxons' Copthorne Hundred. As Saxon records are scant and the church and population were smaller, no church in Headley was known during this period; the first records of a church are after the Norman Conquest. Next to the present 19th-century church is a grotto, constructed using materials from the earlier 15th-century church and placed over the grave of the Revd Ferdinand Faithful.

Headley appears in Domesday Book of 1086 as the manor of Hallega. It was held by Radulfus (Ralph) de Felgeres. Its domesday assets were: 2 hides; 6 ploughs, woodland worth 15 hogs. It rendered £5 per year to its overlords. The survey records that the manor was held before the conquest by Countess Goda (the mother of King Harold) and it had been granted to her by King Edward the Confessor. Halle(g)a means a clearing in the heather, which is appropriate considering the village's position on a large patch of acidic topsoil of the generally alkaline North Downs.

The church, dedicated to St Mary and designed by Anthony Salvin, was built in 1855, with an added tower of 1859 by G. E. Street. It is built from relatively local flint rubble and is listed Grade II. The triptych (1895) on the altar is by Charles Edgar Buckeridge.

Walter Cunliffe, later 1st Baron Cunliffe and the Governor of the Bank of England, was given the original farmhouse estate, formerly the main manor, and its remaining , Headley Court, in 1880 by his father on the condition that he would make a career in banking rather than become a farmer. He redeveloped it in 1898. The family fortune had been made by Walter's grandfather, James Cunliffe, with his development of the North Eastern Railway.

Land use and Headley Heath
There has been little new housing built in the late 20th century and early 21st century as the village is part of the London Green Belt and the Surrey Hills Area of Outstanding Natural Beauty.  Substantially, the steep and quick-draining land is covered by woods.  A large minority of field land in the village is used primarily for grazing by the many riding establishments in the area. Headley Heath is managed by the National Trust, and other nearby areas are controlled by the Surrey Wildlife Trust and other nature reserves. The heath is part of the Mole Gap to Reigate Escarpment Site of Special Scientific Interest.

Economy
Most of the population work outside the village: care and rehabilitation work, maintenance, extension work, equestrian work and agriculture being the main categories of work within the village.

Headley Court

There is a military hospital (previously run by the RAF Hospital) at Headley Court in the parish, once the manor house, the main building being a reconstruction that took place in 1899. Its playing fields can be used for helicopters. This unit closed in September 2018 and the site was bought for redevelopment in May 2019 by Angle Property.

Amenities
The village has an active church, shop, village hall and pub.

County-supported schools are in Leatherhead, Ashtead, Mickleham and Dorking. Some children attend private schools.

Headley is known for its large heath lands, which are owned by the National Trust, leading out towards Box Hill.  The Heath was used by Canadian troops during World War II as tank and combat training grounds.

Transport
A typically two-hourly bus service (number 21) between Crawley and Epsom connects Headley to Box Hill, Dorking and Leatherhead. A service was provided by Surrey County Council for local children of 5–11 years of age, to the primary schools terminated on 1 September 2006.

A bus service is also provided by St. Andrew's Catholic School, Leatherhead for its pupils (aged 11 to 18).

The nearest station by road is Betchworth, which is served by trains to Redhill, Guildford and Reading. Box Hill & Westhumble station, which has trains to London Victoria and London Waterloo, is also nearby.

Social life and sport
The village has a Parish Council and its hall hosts clubs including: a computer club, cricket club, gardening club and other activities.

The Cock Inn, formerly for a few years the Cock Horse, is the only public house in the village. There is also the RAF Headley Club which is open only to servicemen and women, plus their families of Headley Court.

The Headley Cricket Club was founded in 1893, and now incorporating the Old Freemen's side from nearby City of London Freemen's School. The team play on the ground opposite the main Heath car park, to the south of the village centre and have played in the Surrey Downs League since 2002 on Saturdays and have a Sunday team.

Tyrrells Wood Golf Club is a large private golf course and grounds to the west of the village and partially within the bounds of the parish.

Headley was on the London-Surrey Cycle Classic over the opening weekend of the 2012 London Olympic Games as part of the Box Hill loop, which was covered nine times in the men's event and twice in the women's. With long distance routes in various directions, the roads in and around Headley have become very popular for leisure cycling.

Demography and housing

The average level of accommodation in the region composed of detached houses was 28%, the average that was apartments was 22.6%.

The proportion of households in the civil parish who owned their home outright compares to the regional average of 35.1%.  The proportion who owned their home with a loan compares to the regional average of 32.5%.  The remaining % is made up of rented dwellings (plus a negligible % of households living rent-free).

Emergency services
Headley is served by these emergency services:
Surrey Police. everything is handled from Dorking Police Station, as Headley lies within Mole Valley Division.   
South East Coast Ambulance Service as of 1 July 2006, is the local NHS Ambulance Services Trust. The Surrey Ambulance Service, Sussex, and Kent ambulance services have merged, and have now ceased to exist independently.  Leatherhead or Epsom Ambulance stations are close by.
Surrey Fire & Rescue Service, Leatherhead Fire Station is the first response station for Headley. Although RAF Headley also have 2 Green Goddess Fire engines.

Location

References

External links

Headley Down

Villages in Surrey
Mole Valley
Civil parishes in Surrey